Deede or variant, may refer to:

 , USN ships by the name "Deede"
 , Evarts-class destroyer escort
 LeRoy Clifford Deede, USN DFC recipient

See also 

 DD (disambiguation)
 Dede (disambiguation)
 Dedee, a nickname
 Deedee